Zupaysaurus ("ZOO-pay-SAWR-us") is an extinct genus of early theropod dinosaur living during the Norian stage of the Late Triassic in what is now Argentina. Fossils of the dinosaur were found in the Los Colorados Formation of the Ischigualasto-Villa Unión Basin in northwestern Argentina. It may have had two parallel crests running the length of its snout.

Discovery 
Discovered in May 1997 by Santiago Reuil ("Vultur"), part of the crew of Guillermo Rougier, it was later described by Arcucci and Coria and published in 2003. The name Zupaysaurus is composed of the Quechua word supay meaning "devil" and the Greek word  meaning "lizard"; thus "devil lizard". In Incan mythology, supay was both the god of death and ruler of the ukhu pacha, the Incan underworld. The type species was named Z. rougieri in the honor of Guillermo Rougier, the scientist who led the expedition which discovered and collected the holotype (original specimen) PULR-076. Zupaysaurus was first described and named in the scientific journal Ameghiniana by Argentine paleontologists Andrea Arcucci and Rodolfo Coria in 2003.

Description 

Zupaysaurus was a medium-sized theropod. In 2010 Gregory S. Paul gave a length of 6 meters (20 ft) and a weight of 250 kg (550 lbs). In 2016 it was given a much smaller size of 4.2 meters (14 ft) and 70 kg (154 lbs). Like all theropods, Zupaysaurus walked only on its hindlegs, leaving its forelimbs free to grasp its prey. The length of the neck bones recovered suggests that this genus has a rather long neck. Like the coelophysoids, Zupaysaurus has a kink in its snout, between the premaxillary and maxillary bones of the upper jaw. It is estimated that Zupaysaurus had 24 teeth and an intermandibular hinge is present in the lower jaw. Only one specimen of Zupaysaurus is known to science. The holotype specimen was designated PULR-076, which consists of a nearly complete skull which was very well preserved, the right shoulder girdle, the lower right leg and ankle, and twelve vertebrae from the neck, back, and hips. Additional material of a smaller individual found at the same site may or may not belong to Zupaysaurus.
As Zupaysaurus was originally described, the head bore two thin parallel crests on top of the skull, similar to theropods like Dilophosaurus and Coelophysis kayentakatae. These crests are thought to have been formed by the nasal bones solely, unlike those of many other theropods which also incorporated the lacrimal bones. Crests on the skull were pervasive among theropods and may have been used for communicative purposes such as species or gender recognition. However, more recent analysis of the skull has cast doubt on the presence of these crests in Zupaysaurus. An unpublished abstract presented at a recent conference indicated the structures initially identified as crests were in fact the lacrimal bones displaced upwards during the process of fossilization. Other cranial ornamentation included a rugose laterally-projecting lacrimal ridge on the top of the skull.

A diagnosis is a statement of the anatomical features of an organism (or group) that collectively distinguish it from all other organisms. Some, but not all, of the features in a diagnosis are also autapomorphies. An autapomorphy is a distinctive anatomical feature that is unique to a given organism or group. According to Ezcurra (2006) and Ezcurra and Novas (2006), Zupaysaurus can be distinguished based on the following characteristics: the maxillary fenestra is within the antorbital fossa (according to Ezcurra, 2006), the rostral process of the lacrimal is ventrally bowed (according to Ezcurra, 2006), the ventral process of the squamosal is kinked (according to Ezcurra, 2006), wide contact between squamosal and quadratojugal (according to Ezcurra, 2006). The maxillary-jugal ventral margin describes an obtuse angle in lateral view (according to Ezcurra and Novas, 2006), a notch on the dorsal margin of the ascending process of the maxilla, relating to horizontal ramus of the lacrimal is rostrally tapering onto the forked caudal tip of the ascending process of the maxilla; (according to Ezcurra and Novas, 2006), a lacrimal with a highly pneumatized antorbital recess (according to Ezcurra and Novas, 2006), a short and square-shaped retroarticular process of the mandible (according to Ezcurra and Novas, 2006), the cnemial crest is poorly developed (according to Ezcurra and Novas, 2006).

Classification 
Zupaysaurus was classified as the earliest known tetanuran theropod due to several features of its skull, dentition, and hindlimb. However, several features typical of more basal theropods were also noted by the original authors. Analyses by Carano (2005), Tykoski (2005), and Ezcurra and Novas (2005) have classified Zupaysaurus as a coelophysoid related to Segisaurus and probably Liliensternus, though more basal than Coelophysis. Yates (2006) found Zupaysaurus to form a group with Dilophosaurus and Dracovenator, placing it in a monophyletic Dilophosauridae. But later studies found Zupaysaurus to be a sister taxon sister to a clade containing dilophosaurids, ceratosaurs and tetanurans.

Below is a cladogram based on the phylogenetic analysis conducted by Sues et al. in 2011, showing the relationships of Zupaysaurus:

Paleoecology 
Zupaysaurus was discovered in red siliciclastic sediments at the "Quebrada de los Jachaleros" locality within the Los Colorados Formation of the La Rioja province in Argentina. This formation has been shown by magnetostratigraphy to date to the Norian stage of the Late Triassic period, approximately 228 to 208 million years ago. but has also been assigned to the slightly younger Rhaetian stage, which was approximately 208 to 201 million years ago. Both specimens assigned to this genus are housed in the collection of the National University of La Rioja in La Rioja, Argentina.

The Los Colorados Formation was interpreted as an ancient floodplain and it was home to several types of early sauropodomorph dinosaurs (including Riojasaurus, Coloradisaurus , and Lessemsaurus), all of which shared the same paleoenvironment with Zupaysaurus. It is recognized as one of the earliest known faunal assemblages dominated by dinosaurs, which were 43% of the number of tetrapod species currently known. The non-dinosaurs that inhabited this locality included pseudosuchians, therapsids like Cynodontia, other early reptiles, and possible archosaurs.

References

External links 
 Zupaysaurus entry in The Theropod Database.

Prehistoric neotheropods
Dinosaur genera
Norian life
Late Triassic dinosaurs of South America
Triassic Argentina
Fossils of Argentina
Los Colorados Formation
Fossil taxa described in 2003
Taxa named by Rodolfo Coria